"Scenes from the Class Struggle in Springfield" is the fourteenth episode of the seventh season of the American animated television series The Simpsons. It originally aired on the Fox network in the United States on February 4, 1996. In this episode, Marge buys a Chanel suit and is invited to join the Springfield Country Club. Marge becomes obsessed with trying to fit in, but she decides she would rather go back to the way things were than continue to pursue high social ambitions.

The episode was written by Jennifer Crittenden and directed by Susie Dietter. It was the first time that a female writer and director were credited in the same episode. Tom Kite guest starred in the episode, and he enjoyed recording his parts for it. The episode's title is based on the 1989 film Scenes from the Class Struggle in Beverly Hills.

Since airing, the episode has received mostly positive reviews from television critics. It acquired a Nielsen rating of 8.8, and was the fifth-highest-rated show on the Fox network the week it aired.

Plot
The Simpsons travel to the Ogdenville mall to buy a new television after Grampa breaks their old one. Marge and Lisa visit a discount store, where Marge finds a fancy $2800 Chanel suit on sale for $90. Later Marge encounters an old classmate, Evelyn, at the Kwik-E-Mart. Evelyn is impressed by Marge's fashion sense and invites her to the Springfield Country Club.

Desperately trying to fit in with Evelyn's snobby friends at the club, Marge ignores their catty remarks after she wears the same Chanel suit on each visit. Lisa enjoys horseback riding at the club, but the rest of the family is uncomfortable there. After being trained by Tom Kite, Homer plays golf on the club's greens and learns Waylon Smithers is helping Mr. Burns cheat while caddying for him. In exchange for Homer's silence, Burns agrees to help Marge join the club.

Marge tries to alter her suit for the club membership ceremony, but accidentally destroys it with her sewing machine, forcing her to buy a new suit. As the family walks toward the party, Marge criticizes everyone else's behavior. When Homer tells the children they should thank her for pointing out how bad they really are, Marge realizes she has changed for the worse. The family skips the party and goes to Krusty Burger instead, unaware that the club has accepted Marge's membership.

Production

The episode was written by Jennifer Crittenden and directed by Susie Dietter. It was the first time a female writer and director were credited in the same episode. The episode's title is a parody of the film Scenes from the Class Struggle in Beverly Hills. The first script of the episode was too long and it had to be cut down. Dietter remembered that it "took on a more serious tone" because they had to keep the parts that were essential to the story and cut the many "throwaway gags". Bill Oakley, the show runner of The Simpsons at the time, praised the episode for having a "terrific" story that "really comes together well". Oakley said that he and fellow show runner Josh Weinstein wanted to have more "emotionally" based episodes this season that still had humor in them. He thought Crittenden did a "good job" at that and he thought the episode "came out well".

Marge's suit was modeled on an actual Chanel suit, and also the type of dresses that former First Lady Jacqueline Kennedy Onassis used to wear. The show's creator, Matt Groening, was worried that such a detailed outfit would look "weird" on a Simpsons character because they are "simply designed" and their clothing is "very generic". He ended up liking the design, though, and Dietter thought it looked "good" on Marge. Oakley also liked the design and thought the cut on Marge was "flattering". The country club women's clothes were changed in every scene, something Dietter thought was hard to do because the animators had to come up with new designs.

Tom Kite guest starred in the episode as himself. He said that he "really enjoyed" recording his parts for it. "It was a lot of fun trying to imagine exactly what Homer's golf swing is going to look like. My number one fear is that Homer will end up having a better golf swing than I do—heaven forbid!", he added.

Cultural references
At the electronic appliance store, "Panaphonic", "Magnetbox" and "Sorny" are parodies of Panasonic, Magnavox and Sony respectively.

Reception
In its original broadcast, "Scenes from the Class Struggle in Springfield" finished 64th in the ratings for the week of January 29 to February 4, 1996, with a Nielsen rating of 8.8. The episode was the fifth-highest-rated show on the Fox network that week.

Since airing, the episode has received mostly positive reviews from television critics. Warren Martyn and Adrian Wood, authors of the book I Can't Believe It's a Bigger and Better Updated Unofficial Simpsons Guide, summed it up as follows: "Marge looks great in her Chanel, the golf scenes between Homer and Mr. Burns are brilliant, and there are many true, touching moments as Marge struggles valiantly to improve herself. Yet again, it's tempting for the viewer to urge Marge on and get the hell away from the family."

DVD Movie Guide's Colin Jacobson said that he does not know if he "accepts" the episode as being "in character" for Marge. He said that it borrows liberally from The Flintstones, but he "likes it anyway". Jacobson added that the episode "jabs the idle rich nicely", and he enjoyed the golf scenes with Homer.

Jennifer Malkowski of DVD Verdict considered the best part of the episode to be Mr. Burns's demand for his tires to be revulcanized at the gas station. She concluded her review by giving the episode a grade of B.

The authors of the book Homer Simpson Goes to Washington, Joseph Foy and Stanley Schultz, wrote that in the episode, "the tension of trying to demonstrate a family's achievement of the American Dream is satirically and expertly played out by Marge Simpson".

References

External links

The Simpsons (season 7) episodes
1996 American television episodes
Social class in the United States
Golf animation
Television episodes about social class